Robert D. Phillips (born May 29, 1956) is an American politician and a Democratic member of the Rhode Island House of Representatives representing District 51 since January 2011.

Education
Phillips earned his BS in business administration from the University of Rhode Island.

Elections
2012 Phillips was unopposed for the September 11, 2012 Democratic Primary, winning with 620 votes and won the November 6, 2012 General election with 2,805 votes (63.7%) against Republican nominee Christopher Roberts.
2008 When District 51 Democratic Representative Roger Picard ran for Rhode Island Senate and left the seat open, Phillips ran in the six-way September 23, 2008 Democratic Primary, but lost to Christopher M. Fierro, who was unopposed for the November 4, 2008 General election.
2010 Phillips challenged Representative Fierro in the September 23, 2010 Democratic Primary, winning with 562 votes (53.3%) and was unopposed for the November 2, 2010 General election, winning with 2,373 votes.

References

External links
Official page at the Rhode Island General Assembly

Robert Phillips at Ballotpedia
Robert D. Phillips at the National Institute on Money in State Politics

1956 births
21st-century American politicians
Living people
Democratic Party members of the Rhode Island House of Representatives
People from Wiltshire
Politicians from Woonsocket, Rhode Island
University of Rhode Island alumni